The Neustadt  (German for New Town) is a district of Strasbourg, Bas-Rhin, France. In 2017, the heart of the district was listed as a World Heritage Site by UNESCO, as an extension of the site including the older city centre (Grande Île) and Strasbourg Cathedral. The district is a unique example of city planning, merging the Haussmannian model with elements of Germanic architecture and urban planning.

History and description 
The Neustadt district was created by the Germans during the Reichsland period (1871–1918) to serve as a new city center. As opposed to the old town on the Grande Île, which in 1871 had more narrow and crooked streets and less squares than today, the new town was conceived along monumental boulevards and broad, rectilinear streets that were seen as modern, healthy and easy to police. In order to gain the necessary space, several belts of fortifications, mostly dating from the years 1519–1552, and 1630–1681, were torn down; remains of these are found with each archaeological excavation in the area. Many architectural styles were used for the construction of the Neustadt, mostly on a grand scale: Baroque Revival, Renaissance Revival, Gothic Revival, Romanesque Revival, often a mixture of several or all of these styles (Historicism). At the end of the 19th century, at the same time as a new building material, reinforced concrete, a new and better defined style appeared as well: Art Nouveau.

The Neustadt comprises a number of public buildings and monuments that are today classified as Monuments historiques, such as:
Palais du Rhin, former palace of the German Emperors
University Palace (also the observatory, the zoological museum, the botanical garden etc.)
National and University Library
National Theatre of Strasbourg, the former Parliament building of Alsace-Lorraine
Palais de Justice
Palais des Fêtes
St Paul's Church
Strasbourg railway station
Hôtel Brion
Villa Schutzenberger
22, Rue du Général de Castelnau
56, Allée de la Robertsau
and also landmarks that are not classified as Monuments historiques (as of 2019), such as the Saint-Pierre-le-Jeune Catholic Church.

Notable architects
Fritz Beblo
Berninger & Krafft
Jean Geoffroy Conrath
Hermann Eggert
August Hartel
Johann Eduard Jacobsthal
Ludwig Levy
Lütke & Backes
Skjold Neckelmann
August Orth
Otto Warth

References

Literature
Recht, Roland; Foessel, Georges; Klein, Jean-Pierre: Connaître Strasbourg, 1988, pages 253–272
Bengel, Sabine; Jordan, Benoît; Nohlen, Klaus; Werlé, Maxime et al.: Strasbourg, de la Grande Île à la Neustadt, un patrimoine urbain exceptionnel, 2013, 
Rapetti, Rodolphe; Schnitzler, Bernadette; et al.: Strasbourg 1900, naissance d'une capitale, 2000, 
Befort, Paul-André; Daul Léon; Kontzler Chantal; Lery Pierre: Strasbourg 1900, carrefour des arts nouveaux, 2010, 
Doucet, Hervé; Haegel, Olivier; Pottecher, Marie; et al.: La Neustadt de Strasbourg : un laboratoire urbain (1871-1930), 2017,

External links
La Neustadt : quartier impérial et université on strasbourg.eu
La Neustadt on patrimoine-neustadt-strasbourg.fr
Le quartier impérial allemand (1870–1918) on otstrasbourg.fr
Cathy Blanc-Reibel: The case of Neustadt (Strasbourg), Co-construction of an Urban and Architectural Heritage, Revue des sciences sociales, 15 July 2017.

Geography of Strasbourg